Yin Changji (born 17 March 1995) is a Chinese footballer of Korean descent.

Club career
Yin Changji was promoted to the Yanbian's first team squad in the summer of 2015. On 1 April 2017, Yin made his senior debut in a 1–0 home defeat against Guangzhou R&F as the benefit of the new rule of the Super League that at least one Under-23 player must in the starting. He was substituted off in the 27th minute. He started in another three league matches against Tianjin Quanjian, Hebei China Fortune and Tianjin Teda in April, and was substituted off in the 14th, 9th and 9th minute, respectively. Yin was degraded to Yanbian's reserve squad in June 2017.

On 2 March 2019, Yin transferred to China League Two side Yanbian Beiguo. On February 4, 2020, Yanbian Beiguo was disqualified for 2020 China League Two due to its failure to hand in the salary and bonus confirmation form before the deadline.

Career statistics

References

External links
 

1995 births
Living people
Chinese footballers
Association football defenders
People from Yanbian
Yanbian Funde F.C. players
Chinese Super League players
Chinese people of Korean descent
Footballers from Jilin